A Healing House of Prayer contains daily readings for a month, each day covering a different theme. In addition readings for feast days and holy days are included with a number devoted to various aspects of healing.

An example:

C. S. Lewis said:

Morris Maddocks
Hodder & Stoughton books
1987 books